In the qualifying procedure for the 1988 UEFA European Under-16 Football Championship, 29 teams were divided into 14 groups (13 groups of two teams and one group of three teams) each. The fourteen group winners advanced to the final tournament. The runner-up of the group with three teams and Spain (as host) were also qualified.

Results

Group 1

Group 2

Group 3

Group 4

Group 5

Group 6

Group 7

Group 8

Group 9

Group 10

Group 11

Group 12

Group 13

Group 14

Notes

References
UEFA.com
RSSSF.com

Qualifying
UEFA European Under-17 Championship qualification